The Countess of Dufferin Range is a small subrange of the Kitimat Ranges, running along the east side of Grenville Channel on the south side of Lowe Inlet in British Columbia, Canada.

The range was named for Hariot Georgina, wife of the Earl of Dufferin who served as the third Governor General of Canada from 1872-1878.

References

Kitimat Ranges